Chandigarh Territorial Congress Committee is the wing of the Indian National Congress in the union territory of Chandigarh. Harmohinder Singh Lucky is its current State unit president, and also a former mayor of Chandigarh and has almost 4 decades of experience in politics and social life. Sh. Pawan Kumar Bansal is one of the most prominent faces and seniormost leader of Chandigarh Congress and has been a former MP and Union Minister from Chandigarh. He is currently the Treasurer of Indian National Congress.

See also
 Indian National Congress
 Congress Working Committee
 All India Congress Committee
 Pradesh Congress Committee

References

External links

Indian National Congress by state or union territory